Jared MacLeod (born 3 April 1980 in Winnipeg, Manitoba) is a Canadian athlete specializing in the high hurdles. He won the silver at the 2005 Summer Universiade.

His outdoor 110 meters hurdles personal best is 13.54 from 2005. His indoor 60 meters personal best is 7.70 (2006).

He currently sits on the Athletics Canada Board of Directors as an Athlete Representative.

Competition record

References

External links
 
 
 
 

1980 births
Living people
Canadian male hurdlers
Universiade medalists in athletics (track and field)
Athletes from Winnipeg
Universiade silver medalists for Canada
Athletes (track and field) at the 2006 Commonwealth Games
Commonwealth Games competitors for Canada
Athletes (track and field) at the 2007 Pan American Games
Pan American Games track and field athletes for Canada
World Athletics Championships athletes for Canada
Medalists at the 2005 Summer Universiade